Natmauk is a town in Magway District, in eastern Magway Region of Myanmar, on the Yin River. It is the administrative seat of Natmauk Township.  Natmauk is famous for being the birthplace and hometown of the Burmese independence hero, Bogyoke Aung San.

Transport
Natmauk is one of major stops on the Yangon to Bagan Express railway road. It also lies about midway on the major east–west Pyawbwe to Magway road.

External links
 "Natmauk Map — Satellite Images of Natmauk" Maplandia

Populated places in Magway Region
Township capitals of Myanmar